Paula Frías Allende (22 October 1963 – 6 December 1992) was an educator and humanitarian who was the daughter of Chilean-American author Isabel Allende. Her grandfather was first cousin to Salvador Allende, President of Chile from 1970 to 1973. After her death, her mother started a foundation to continue works in Paula's name.

Life
Allende worked as a humanitarian for impoverished communities located in Venezuela and Spain, using her skills as an educator and psychologist. She married Ernesto Diaz in Venezuela, in 1991.

Illness and death
In 1991, Paula went into a coma after complications of porphyria had hospitalised her. An error in medication resulted in severe brain damage, leaving her in a persistent vegetative state. Her mother had her moved to a hospital in California and later to her home, where she died at the age of 29 on 6 December 1992.

Foundation and memoirs
Isabel Allende started the Isabel Allende Foundation on December 9, 1996, in homage to her daughter. Her autobiographical book Paula is dedicated to her. The foundation is "dedicated to supporting programs that promote and preserve the fundamental rights of women and children to be empowered and protected."

References

1963 births
1992 deaths
Allende family
Chilean people of Basque descent
Chilean educators
Chilean women educators
Chilean humanitarians
Chilean psychologists
Chilean women psychologists
20th-century psychologists